Orthodox Tewahedo refers to two Oriental Orthodox Christian denominations with shared beliefs, liturgy, and history. The Orthodox Tewahedo biblical canon is common to both churches, as is Orthodox Tewahedo music.

 The Ethiopian Orthodox Tewahedo Church, autocephalous since 1959.
 The Eritrean Orthodox Tewahedo Church, autocephalous since 1993.

See also 
 Oriental Orthodox Churches

Oriental Orthodoxy